Paul Volpe may refer to:
 Paul Volpe (mobster), Italian-Canadian mobster
 Paul Volpe (poker player), American poker player